Southern Comfort is an album by jazz saxophonist Frank Wess which was recorded in 1962 and released on the Prestige label.

Reception

The Allmusic site awarded the album 4 stars stating "Nelson's attractive arrangements serve Wess quite well throughout this session... To his credit, Nelson doesn't over-arrange. There is still plenty of room for blowing and improvising, and Wess sounds very uninhibited on everything... One of Wess' most rewarding sessions".

Track listing 
All compositions by Frank Wess except where noted:
 "Southern Comfort" (Oliver Nelson) - 6:33   
 "Blue Skies" (Irving Berlin) - 5:45   
 "Gin's Beguine" - 6:46   
 "Blues for Butterball" (Bob Bryant, Marshall Dodge) - 4:54   
 "Summer Frost" - 3:59   
 "Dancing in the Dark" (Howard Dietz, Arthur Schwartz) - 4:39   
 "Shufflin'" (Nelson) - 3:01

Personnel 
Frank Wess - flute, tenor saxophone
Al Aarons - trumpet
George Barrow - baritone saxophone
Tommy Flanagan - piano
George Duvivier - bass
Osie Johnson - drums
Ray Barretto - congas
Oliver Nelson - arranger, tenor saxophone

References 

Frank Wess albums
1962 albums
Prestige Records albums
Albums produced by Esmond Edwards
Albums recorded at Van Gelder Studio
Albums arranged by Oliver Nelson